Linstead Magna is a civil parish in the East Suffolk district of Suffolk in eastern England.

Population and civil parish
In 2005 its population was 60. It shares a civil parish council with nearby Chediston and Linstead Parva. At the 2011 Census the population was listed under Linstead Parva only.

Parish church
The ancient parish church of Linstead Magna was dedicated to St Peter. The church fell into ruins many centuries ago, and almost no trace remains. The two Linstead parishes were combined, and now share the parish church of Linstead Parva (dedicated to St Margaret of Antioch). Nonetheless, a procession and open air service is held at the site of the church on Church Farm, Linstead Magna, every two years.

References

External links
Chediston and Linstead Parish Council

Civil parishes in Suffolk
Suffolk Coastal